Swedes in America is a 1943 American short documentary film directed by Irving Lerner and produced by the Overseas Motion Picture Bureau of the United States Office of War Information. It was nominated for an Academy Award for Best Documentary Short.

References

External links

Swedes in America at the National Archives and Records Administration

1943 films
1943 documentary films
1943 short films
American short documentary films
Black-and-white documentary films
1940s short documentary films
Films directed by Irving Lerner
Swedish-American history
Documentary films about immigration to the United States
American World War II propaganda shorts
American black-and-white films
1940s English-language films
1940s American films